Subliminal Sandwich is a 1996 double album released by Meat Beat Manifesto on Interscope Records. The album is more experimental than the group's prior material, composed of lengthier pieces that incorporate more ambient textures and drones and fewer samples or defined song structures.

Subliminal Sandwich was composed during Meat Beat Manifesto's 1993 tour supporting their 1992 album Satyricon and would have been released in 1994 or 1995 if not for legal tangles with the band's Belgian label Play It Again Sam. Two singles were released from the album, a version of World Domination Enterprises' "Asbestos Lead Asbestos" and "Transmission".

In 2015, Fact Magazine ranked the album at number 47 in its list of "The 50 Best Trip-Hop Albums of All Time," saying "it remains an interesting offering, drawing links between trip-hop, dub, industrial and ambient with a touch of psychedelia."

The song "She's Unreal" was featured on the soundtrack of the 1999 film The Blair Witch Project, on a "mix tape" entitled Josh's Blair Witch Mix.

Track listing
All songs written by Jack Dangers (unless otherwise noted).

Disc one
 "Sound Innovation" – 2:18
 "Nuclear Bomb" – 6:12
 "Long Periods of Time" – 4:33
 "1979" – 5:25
 "Future Worlds" – 4:56
 "What's Your Name?" – 2:47
 "She's Unreal" – 4:10
 "Asbestos Lead Asbestos" (Keith Dobson) – 6:22
 "Mass Producing Hate" – 3:01
 "Radio Mellotron" – 1:07
 "Assassinator" – 5:22
 "Phone Calls from the Dead" – 3:13
 "Lucid Dream" – 2:09
 "Addiction" – 4:07
 "No Purpose No Design" – 2:18
 "Cancer" – 4:34
 "Transmission" – 4:09
 "We Done" – 2:07

Disc two
 "Set Your Receivers" – 0:23
 "Mad Bomber/The Woods" – 10:16
 "The Utterer" – 6:51
 "United Nations (E.T.C.)" – 4:05
 "Stereophrenic" – 13:03
 "Teargas" – 0:38
 "Plexus" – 3:29
 "Electric People" – 14:03
 "Tweekland" – 7:55
 "Simulacra" – 8:20

Personnel
 Jack Dangers – voice, bass, waterphone, bass clarinet, mellotron, theremin, synthesizers, samples, turntables and dishes

Disc 1 collaborators
 Joe Gore – guitar (tracks 5, 6, 7, 14)
 Hell Louise – voice (tracks 6, 17)
 Mike Powell – theremin, b. voice (tracks 3, 9)
 Jonny Stevens – guitar (track 8)

Disc 2 collaborators
 Arjan Macnamara – Jupiter 8 (track 10)
 Mark Pistel – Moog, OB 8, e. bow, theremin (tracks 3, 8, 9)
 Mike Powell – theremin (track 5, 8)
 Philip Steir – Octapad (track 2)
 Jonny Stevens – 100 M system, OBM-X (tracks 3, 5)
 Ben Stokes – percussion (track 3)
 Lee Walker – Jupiter 8, Jupiter 4 (tracks 4, 7)
 John Wilson – feedback generator (track 3)

References

1996 albums
Meat Beat Manifesto albums
Albums produced by Jack Dangers
Nothing Records albums